The MLS Referee of the Year is a Major League Soccer award presented to the best referee annually since 1997. Since 2008, the league has also presented an Assistant Referee of the Year award. The awards are voted on by the media, the players, and the club executives.

Winners

See also
Professional Referee Organization
Referee (association football)
Assistant referee (association football)

References

Referee of the Year
 
Awards established in 1997